Orthobasis bicolor is a species of beetle in the family Carabidae, the only species in the genus Orthobasis.

References

Lebiinae